Stadium is the ninth studio album by American percussionist Eli Keszler. It was released in October 2018 under Shelter Press.

Track listing

Accolades

References

2018 albums